Ampelokipoi ( meaning "vineyard") is a village and a community in the southern part of the island of Zakynthos. It is part of the municipal unit of Zakynthos (city). In 2011 its population was 1,606 for the village and 1,930 for the community, including the village Kalpaki. It is 3 km northwest of Kalamaki, 4 km north of Laganas and 3 km southwest of Zakynthos city. The Zakynthos International Airport is 1 km southeast.

Population

See also

List of settlements in Zakynthos

External links
Ampelokipoi at the GTP Travel Pages

References

Populated places in Zakynthos